An aphelion is the farthest point of an orbit around the Sun.

Aphelion may also refer to:

Music 
 Aphelion (Edenbridge album), 2003
 Aphelion (Dave Rempis album), 2014
 Aphelion (Leprous album), 2021
 "Aphelion", 2014 electronic music single by the American group Scandroid

Other uses 
 Aphelion (software), a software suite for image processing and analysis
 Aphelion, 2007 novel by Australian writer Emily Ballou

See also 
 Apeiron (disambiguation)